Benjamin Bederson (November 15, 1921 – January 6, 2023) was an American physicist. He worked on the Manhattan Project.

Background
Bederson graduated from City College of New York, Columbia University, and New York University. He worked at Massachusetts Institute of Technology and was a dean at New York University. From 1992 to 1996, he was an Editor-in-Chief of Physical Review. 

In 1959, Bederson was elected a Fellow of the American Physical Society.

Bederson died on January 6, 2023, at the age of 101.

References

External links 
 
 
 Benjamin Bederson's Interview (2018) — Voices of the Manhattan Project
 Physics History Network: Benjamin Bederson
Ben Bederson, The Manhattan Project, 2020 — The National WWII Museum

1921 births
2023 deaths
20th-century American physicists
City College of New York alumni
Columbia University alumni
New York University alumni
Scientists from New York City
Manhattan Project people
Fellows of the American Physical Society
American centenarians
Men centenarians